The Back River, a perennial stream of the Tuross River catchment, is located in the Monaro and South Coast regions of New South Wales, Australia.

Course and features
The river flows generally north northwest, and south by west, before reaching its confluence with the Tuross River near Two River Plain. The river descends  over its  course.

See also

 Rivers of New South Wales
 List of rivers of New South Wales (A-K)
 List of rivers of Australia

References

External links
 

 

Rivers of New South Wales
South Coast (New South Wales)